Valentin Kubrakov (born 25 July 1972) is a Russian basketball player. He competed in the men's tournament at the 2000 Summer Olympics.

References

External links
 

1972 births
Living people
Russian men's basketball players
Olympic basketball players of Russia
Basketball players at the 2000 Summer Olympics
People from Salsk
Sportspeople from Rostov Oblast